Rusty Russell may refer to:

 Rusty Russell (born 1973), Australian software programmer
 Rusty Russell (tackle) (born 1963), American football player
 Rusty Russell (American football coach) (1895–1983), American football coach